Bonaventure Patrick Paul OFM† (26 March 1929, Karachi - 18 January 2007) was a former Bishop of Hyderabad, Pakistan.

Career
He received his early education at St Patrick's High School, Karachi. He received his religious training under the Order of Friars Minor at the Portiuncula Friary in Karachi, and was ordained a priest in Karachi on 1 March 1954.

In March 1961 Fr. Bonaventure was posted to St. Jude's Parish where he served until 1966.

In 1967 Pope Paul VI appointed him Apostolic Administrator of the Roman Catholic Diocese of Hyderabad. On 14 June 1971 he was consecrated Bishop.

He resigned from the office of Bishop of Hyderabad in 1990. He then dedicated himself to education through speaking at events like a Basic Christian Formation Course organised by the Catechetical Centre, Karachi, and social justice issues.

From 1998–2001 he was chairman of the Pakistan bishops' National Commission for Justice and Peace.

Bishop Paul died on 18 January 2007.

References

20th-century Roman Catholic bishops in Pakistan
St. Patrick's High School, Karachi alumni
1929 births
2007 deaths
Pakistani Friars Minor
Roman Catholic bishops of Hyderabad in Pakistan